Sohail Ahmed is a reformed former radical Islamist who was at one point considering carrying out a terror attack in his home city of London. He now works in the fields of counter-extremism, counter-terrorism, and social integration. He has featured in the media and has written for a number of publications exploring his personal journey, LGBT rights in the Muslim world, and Islamic extremism. He has also exposed the prevalence of radical jihadism in British universities.

Background 
Sohail is a British citizen of Pakistani heritage. His parents settled in London following the main wave of immigration from Mirpur, situated in Pakistan-controlled Kashmir. Originally coming from a Barelvi Islamic background, his parents later became radicalised and started believing in the Salafist form of Islam.

Sohail is a gay man who struggled with his sexuality as a Muslim.

== Education ==
Sohail attended Norlington School for Boys, and then later studied at Sir George Monoux College where he took A-levels.

He is currently studying towards an undergraduate Mathematics and Statistics degree with the Open University.

Radicalisation 
Sohail was raised as an Islamist by his family. He was taught to believe that the West is the enemy, that it is the duty of every Muslim to fight violent jihad against non-Muslims, and that Muslims will rise up against the infidels when the Islamic scholars say the time is right. He was also taught that biological evolution as an explanation of the origins of humanity was false, and that believing in evolution would take one outside the fold of Islam. In addition, he was fed a cocktail of various conspiracy theories, which had a role to play in his extremist views.

He became further radicalised in response to the Iraq and Afghanistan military interventions by the United States and the United Kingdom. He was taught at his local mosque that the Iraq and Afghanistan interventions were representative of a war against Islam and Muslims. Consequently, he began considering carrying out a terror attack in London.

Sohail has mentioned that his sexuality also had a significant impact on his journey towards radicalism. In an attempt to change his sexuality, he became even more religious and observant, and given that he was a Salafist, this, in practice, resulted in him becoming ever more extreme in his views.

Radicalising others 
Sohail admits that whilst he was an Islamist, he was involved in propagating his radical views at Sir George Monoux College. He also admits that he had radicalised a fellow British Muslim who later went on to fight Jihad with the now defunct Islamic State in Syria.

Deradicalisation 
Sohail ultimately decided not to engage in violence. He then began to doubt his religious beliefs, which mainly centred around questioning the anti-science views he was raised with, in particular regarding the rejection of biological evolution. This culminated in him studying evolution, which in turn led to him abandoning his Salafist views.

He then later questioned the concept of revelation and religion, which resulted in him becoming a deist. He then began questioning the existence of God and became an agnostic. He now describes himself as a cultural Muslim, retaining a connection to his religion, whilst simultaneously rejecting its truth claims.

Activism and current work 
Sohail has campaigned for LGBT rights in the Muslim community, and against Islamic extremism. He is also an active Labour party member.

Sohail now works in the fields of counter-terrorism and counter-extremism. He is currently an intern at the Henry Jackson Society.

References 

Year of birth missing (living people)
Living people
Labour Party (UK) people
English people of Kashmiri descent
English people of Pakistani descent
English agnostics
English LGBT people
Former Muslims turned agnostics or atheists